Strinava Glacier is the 6 km long and 3 km wide glacier in Sullivan Heights on the east side of Sentinel Range in Ellsworth Mountains, Antarctica.  It is draining the northeast slopes of Mount Farrell and the southeast slopes of the ridge of Mount Levack, and flowing eastwards from Zmeevo Pass to join Dater Glacier west of Dickey Peak in Flowers Hills.

The feature is named after the medieval fortress of Strinava in northern Bulgaria.

Location
US mapping in 1988.

See also
 List of glaciers in the Antarctic
 Glaciology

Maps
 Vinson Massif.  Scale 1:250 000 topographic map.  Reston, Virginia: US Geological Survey, 1988.
 Antarctic Digital Database (ADD). Scale 1:250000 topographic map of Antarctica. Scientific Committee on Antarctic Research (SCAR). Since 1993, regularly updated.

References
 Strinava Glacier. SCAR Composite Antarctic Gazetteer.
 Bulgarian Antarctic Gazetteer. Antarctic Place-names Commission. (details in Bulgarian, basic data in English)

External links
 Strinava Glacier. Copernix satellite image

Glaciers of Ellsworth Land
Bulgaria and the Antarctic